Gord Walker (born August 12, 1965) is a Canadian former professional ice hockey player. He was selected by the New York Rangers in the third round (53rd overall) of the 1983 NHL Entry Draft.

Between 1986 and 1989 he played in 31 National Hockey League games with the New York Rangers and Los Angeles Kings.

Minor hockey career
Walker spent the majority of his playing career in the minor leagues and was a member of the 1983 Memorial Cup champion Portland Winter Hawks.

Family 
Gord's son Luke, was previously a prospect in the Colorado Avalanche farm system and was a member of the United States hockey team that won gold at the 2010 World Junior Ice Hockey Championships in Saskatchewan. Luke was drafted by the Avs in the fifth round of the 2010 NHL Entry Draft.

Awards
 WHL 	West First All-Star Team – 1985

References

External links

1965 births
Canadian ice hockey forwards
Colorado Rangers players
Sportspeople from Castlegar, British Columbia
Kamloops Blazers players
Living people
Los Angeles Kings players
New Haven Nighthawks players
New York Rangers draft picks
New York Rangers players
Portland Winterhawks players
San Diego Gulls (IHL) players
Ice hockey people from British Columbia